I've Got So Much to Give is the debut studio album by American R&B singer Barry White, released on March 27, 1973, on the 20th Century label.

History
The album topped the R&B albums chart. It also reached #16 on the Billboard 200. The album was a success, yielding two Billboard R&B Top Ten singles, "I'm Gonna Love You Just a Little More Baby", which peaked at #1, and the title track. Both were also successful on the Billboard Hot 100, peaking at #3 and #32 respectively. "I'm Gonna Love You Just a Little More Baby" was also a hit on the UK Singles Chart, peaking at #23. The album was digitally remastered and reissued on CD with instrumental bonus tracks on May 4, 2010, by Hip-O Select.

Critical reception

The album received moderate reviews. Stephen Erlewine of AllMusic wrote: "In a sense, his sound is fully formed—there’s no mistaking his velvet baritone or his lush, string-draped surrounding, particularly on the album’s closing “I’m Gonna Love You Just a Little More, Baby,” a song so seductive it set the pace for the rest of his career". However, the album was criticized for sounding like Isaac Hayes. Village Voice critic Robert Christgau wrote "White's hustle is to combine Isaac Hayes's power with Al Green's niceness, and he succeeds, in his way, but the synthesis has its drawbacks--tends to compound his humorlessness and mendacity as well."

Track listing

Personnel
Barry White - lead vocals, arranger, design concept
Gene Page - arranger
Technical
Frank Kejmar - engineer
Ken Veeder - photography
"Special thanks: Joyce Hudson, Linda Allen, Laurie Sepe, Carol Hartsfield, Tony Sepe and Sterling Radcliffe. Very, very special: Love Unlimited. Spiritual advisor: Larry Nunes."

Charts

Weekly charts

Singles

Certifications and sales

See also
List of number-one R&B albums of 1973 (U.S.)

References

External links
I've Got So Much to Give at Discogs

Barry White albums
1973 debut albums
Albums arranged by Gene Page
20th Century Fox Records albums